The M809 Series 5-ton 6x6 truck (G908) was a family of heavy tactical trucks built for the United States Armed Forces. In on-road service the load weight was doubled. Built by AM General, they evolved into the M939 Series.

History 
In the late 1960s the US Army needed more 5-ton (4,536 kg) 6x6 trucks. Kaiser-Jeep developed an updated version of the M39 series which had been in service since 1951. The primary difference was the engine change to Cummins. The hood and grille were lengthened to make room for the longer engine and the lighting system was updated to meet new US safety regulations. All had an air cleaner on the left fender, a way to tell them from the earlier M39 series.

Kaiser-Jeep was awarded the M809-series contract DAAE06-69-C-0009 and built them during 1969 and into 1970. In February 1970, Kaiser-Jeep was purchased by American Motors Corporation and on March 26, 1970, Kaiser-Jeep was reorganized as the "Jeep Corporation." The South Bend facilities where the M809-series was being built subsequently became Jeep Corporation's "General Products Division." Just over a year later, on March 31, 1971, this General Products Division was spun off and became "AM-General," a wholly owned subsidiary of American Motors Corporation. In 1974, a new contract for the M809-series was awarded to AM General, DAAE07-74-C-0120. This contract covered trucks built over the next 5 years at least. AM-General built all M809-series trucks between 1971 and 1982. In 1982, the M809-series was then improved into the M939 series. The first 11,000 M939s were rebuilds of M809s.

Specifications

Engine and driveline

All models of the M809 series used this engine throughout their service life. The N series was a successful commercial design, with a conservative rating the engine was more powerful and less stressed than the Continental LDS-465 multifuel engine used in the M39 series.

A Dana-Spicer 5-speed  model 6453 synchromesh manual transmission had a very low 1st, direct 4th, and overdrive 5th. A Rockwell-Standard 2-speed transfer case also engaged the front axle automatically if the rear wheels turned faster than the front, as when the rear wheels spun, in any gear and any range.

Chassis

The M809 series had a ladder frame with three live axles, the front on leaf springs and the rear tandem on leaf springs with locating arms.

There were three wheelbases (measurements are from the centerline of the front axle to the centerline of rear tandem).

Most models had 11.00x20 size tires with dual rear tires. Some M813s had 14.00x20 with single rear tires, the M821 bridge trucks had 14.00x20 with dual rear tires. The M819 wrecker tractor had 12.00x20 with dual rear tires. All tires were bi-directional military pattern.

Brakes were air over hydraulic with drum brakes on all wheels. Air brake connections at the rear were used for trailer brakes. The M815, M818, and M819 had separate controls to apply the trailer brakes separately from the service brakes.

All M809 models had a rear pintle hitch and could tow  trailers except the M816, which could tow  The M818 and M819 could tow  semi trailers on their fifth wheel.

Many M809 series were equipped with a front-mounted  capacity winch, intended for self-recovery. The M815 had a mid-mounted winch and the M816 had a rear-mounted  capacity winch.

A standard military cab, designed by REO for their  -ton M35, was used. It had hinged doors with roll-up windows, a folding windshield, and a removable canvas roof. A hard roof could be fitted.

Models

M813 & M814 Cargo trucks 

The M813 was the standard cargo version of the series. Side racks, troop seats, and overhead bows with a tarpaulin were standard. A front-mounted winch was optional.

The standard body sides could secure a load but could not be loaded from the side by forklifts, so a body with drop sides was standardized as the M813A1.

There was no drop side version of the M814, and none had troop seats.

M815 Bolster logging truck 

The M815 Bolster logging truck, with the M796 bolster trailer, was used to carry long loads like logs, poles, pipes, and bridge sections. The front of the load was secured to a rotating bolster on the truck and the rear of the load was secured to the trailer. The truck and trailer had a tubular boom ("reach") that connected them under the load. When the truck was unloaded the trailer could be loaded onto the truck. The truck had a large cab protection rack and both front and mid mounted winches.

M816 Medium wrecker truck 

The M816 Medium wrecker truck was used to recover disabled or stuck trucks and lift large components. Although the truck was not meant to carry a load, the boom could support  when towing. They had  front and  rear winches, outriggers, boom braces, chocks, block and tackle, oxygen-acetylene torches, and other automotive tools.

M817 Dump truck 

The M817 dump truck was used to haul sand, gravel, dirt, rubble, scrap, and other bulk materials. It had a  dump body with cab protector and a tailgate that could hinge at either the top or bottom. Normal loads are heavy by volume, the dump body was smaller and more heavily built than a cargo body. They could be equipped with overhead bows, tarpaulin, and troop seats, but the relatively small size of the body limited their passenger or cargo load.

M818 Tractor unit|Tractor trucks 

Semi-tractor/trailers have to stay on relatively flat ground, and are not rated for full off-road use.

The M818 normally towed a 12-ton 2 axle trailer. There were stake and platform, van, low-bed, and tanker bodies. 6-ton 2 axle expansible vans and 6-ton single axle vans were also used.

M819 Medium wrecker tractor truck 

The M819 Medium wrecker tractor truck, with an extra long wheelbase, was a wrecker with a fifth wheel mounted behind the boom. This let the truck load and tow semi trailers. Meant for aircraft recovery, they had a smaller body and less equipment than the M816.

All had a front winch, the fifth wheel replaced the rear winch. Because of the high empty weight as a semi tractor, oversize 12.00x20 tires were used, this was the only model to have this size.

M820 Expansible van truck 

The body could support  of communications equipment. Heaters and air-conditioners (except the M820A1) were housed above the cab. The M820A1 had no windows or air-conditioning, the M820A3 and M820A4 had a hydraulic rear lift gate. None had a front-mounted winch.

M821 Bridge transporting stake truck 

They had a roller on the rear to help unloading and small winches on the side to secure cargo. The stake sides could be removed to carry oversize loads. The largest tires in the series, 14.00x20, were used with dual rear tires.

Dimensions

Gallery

Operators

Notes

References

External links
 M809 series at Olive-Drab
 M809 series at Military-Today
  M809 series at Global Security.org
  M809 series Technical Manuals at  Jatonka
  M809 series Technical Manuals at NSN Depot

Military trucks of the United States
United States Army vehicles
Military vehicles introduced in the 1970s